Kosmos 64 ( meaning Cosmos 64) or Zenit-2 No.17 was a Soviet, first generation, low resolution, optical film-return reconnaissance satellite launched in 1965.

Kosmos 64 was launched by a Vostok-2 rocket, serial number G15001-06, flying from Site 31/6 at the Baikonur Cosmodrome. The launch took place at 10:04 GMT on 25 March 1965, and following its successful arrival in orbit the spacecraft received its Kosmos designation; along with the International Designator 1965-025A and the Satellite Catalog Number 01305.

On 2 April 1965, after eight days in orbit, Kosmos 64 was deorbited with its return capsule descending by parachute for recovery by Soviet forces.

References

Kosmos satellites
Spacecraft launched in 1965
Spacecraft which reentered in 1965
Zenit-2 satellites